{{DISPLAYTITLE:C6H6O4}}
The molecular formula C6H6O4 (molar mass : 142.10 g/mol, exact mass : 142.026608 u) may refer to:

 Dimethyl acetylenedicarboxylate
 5-Hydroxymaltol
 2-Hydroxymuconate semialdehyde
 Kojic acid
 Muconic acid
 Tetrahydroxybenzene
 1,2,3,4-Tetrahydroxybenzene
 1,2,3,5-Tetrahydroxybenzene
 1,2,4,5-Tetrahydroxybenzene